The Miracle of Manhattan is a lost 1921 American silent melodrama film directed by George Archainbaud and starring Elaine Hammerstein and Matt Moore. It was produced by Lewis J. Selznick(of Selznick Pictures) and released through Select Pictures.

Cast
Elaine Hammerstein as Mary Malone/Evelyn Whitney
Matt Moore as Larry Marshall
Ellen Cassidy as Stella Warren (credited as Ellen Cassity)
Nora Reed as An Intruder 
Walter Greene as Tony the Dude
Leonora von Ottinger as Mrs. Peabody (credited as Leonora Ottinger)
John Raymond as Robert Van Cleek (credited as Jack Raymond)

References

External links

 

1921 films
American silent feature films
Lost American films
Films directed by George Archainbaud
American black-and-white films
Silent American drama films
1921 drama films
Melodrama films
Selznick Pictures films
1921 lost films
Lost drama films
1920s American films